Beau Hossler (born March 16, 1995) is an American professional golfer from Rancho Santa Margarita, California. Hossler was only 17 years old when he qualified for his second consecutive U.S. Open, finishing tied for 29th in the 2012 U.S. Open. He had held the outright lead midway through the second round. In 2015, he qualified for the U.S. Open for a third time and tied for 58th place.

Early life
Hossler was born on March 16, 1995. He graduated from Santa Margarita Catholic High School. In 2013, he started at the University of Texas on a golf scholarship.

Professional career
Hossler turned professional in 2016 with one year of college eligibility left.

In June 2017, Hossler secured one of twelve open qualifying places for the Air Capital Classic on the Web.com Tour.  He finished second, enabling him to play more Web.com Tour tournaments that season.  He finished the regular season in 23rd place in the rankings, earning promotion to the PGA Tour.

In April 2018, Hossler lost in a sudden-death playoff at the Houston Open to Ian Poulter. He was co-leader after 54 holes and led the tournament by a stroke on the final hole, before Poulter birdied to force a playoff. On the first extra hole, Hossler hit his bunker shot into the water, resulting in a triple bogey to lose the playoff. This was still Hossler's best result on the PGA Tour to date.

Amateur wins
2010 Trader Joe's Junior Championship, Stockton Sports Commission Junior
2011 Callaway Junior World Golf Championships (boys 15–17)
2012 Winn Grips Heather Farr Classic
2013 Southern California Amateur
2014 Southern California Amateur, Western Amateur
2015 John Hayt Collegiate Invitational, Nike Collegiate Invite
2016 Arizona Intercollegiate, Jones Cup Invitational, John Burns Intercollegiate, Lamkin Grips SD Classic, 3M Augusta Invitational

Source:

Playoff record
PGA Tour playoff record (0–1)

Results in major championships
Results not in chronological order in 2020.

CUT = missed the half-way cut
"T" indicates a tie for a place
NT = No tournament due to COVID-19 pandemic

Results in The Players Championship

CUT = missed the halfway cut
"T" indicates a tie for a place
C = Canceled after the first round due to the COVID-19 pandemic

U.S. national team appearances
Amateur
Junior Ryder Cup: 2012 (winners)
Eisenhower Trophy: 2014 (winners)
Palmer Cup: 2015 (winners)
Walker Cup: 2015

See also
2017 Web.com Tour Finals graduates
2019 Korn Ferry Tour Finals graduates

References

External links

Profile at ESPN.com
Texas Longhorns profile

American male golfers
Texas Longhorns men's golfers
PGA Tour golfers
Golfers at the 2015 Pan American Games
Pan American Games medalists in golf
Pan American Games silver medalists for the United States
Medalists at the 2015 Pan American Games
Korn Ferry Tour graduates
Golfers from California
Golfers from Austin, Texas
People from Rancho Santa Margarita, California
Sportspeople from Mission Viejo, California
1995 births
Living people